Euphilotes ancilla, the Rocky Mountain dotted blue, is a species of butterfly of the family Lycaenidae. It is found from Washington south to California and southern Alberta and Saskatchewan south through the Rockies and high plains to Wyoming, Colorado, Utah, and northwestern New Mexico. The species was first described by William Barnes and James Halliday McDunnough in 1918.

Its wingspan is from 17 to 23 mm. Its habitats include sun-exposed rocky slopes and flats with host plant colonies.

Larvae feed on various Eriogonum species, especially sulphur-flower.

References

Butterflies of North America
Euphilotes
Butterflies described in 1918